Mekongina erythrospila, commonly known as Pa Sa-ee is a cyprinid fish endemic to the Mekong river basin. It grows to  SL.

Distribution and habitat 
It occurs in the Mekong river basin between Kratié and Chiang Rai. It lives in flowing water, mainly in rocky areas.

Utilization 
It is an important commercial fishery species, as well as food fish for local consumption. In Cambodia, it is the most important fishery species by catch weight.

References

Labeoninae
Cyprinid fish of Asia
Fish of the Mekong Basin
Fish of Cambodia
Fish of Laos
Fish of Thailand
Fish of Vietnam
Fish described in 1937
Taxa named by Henry Weed Fowler